Allen Wilbert Benson  (March 28, 1905 – November 16, 1999), nicknamed "Bullet", was a professional baseball player who played pitcher in the Major Leagues in 1934. He would play for the Washington Senators.

Benson played for the bearded House of David baseball team before signing with the Senators. Given the rarity of facial hair among the era's baseball players, the Senators signed Benson largely as a publicity stunt to boost attendance. He became one of very few Major League players who wore facial hair between the deadball era and the 1970s. He struggled in two games and was sent to the minor league Albany Senators. He told reporters "I believe I could have made the grade with the Nats but for these danged whiskers."

References

External links

1900s births
1999 deaths
Major League Baseball pitchers
Washington Senators (1901–1960) players
Akron Tyrites players
Baseball players from South Dakota
People from Turner County, South Dakota
Albany Senators players
Charleroi Babes players
Dallas Steers players
Des Moines Demons players
Harrisburg Senators players
Minneapolis Millers (baseball) players